Heder may refer to:

Cheder, a traditional elementary school teaching the basics of Judaism and the Hebrew language
Héder (genus), a gens in the Kingdom of Hungary
Heder (Lippe), a river of North Rhine-Westphalia, Germany, tributary of the Lippe
Heder (TV series), a Swedish television series

People with that name
Héder, a German knight who settled down in the Kingdom of Hungary, eponymous co-founder of the Héder gens
Carsten Meyer-Heder (born 1961), German CDU politician
János Héder (1933–2014), Hungarian gymnast
Jon Heder (born 1977), American actor and producer
Léopold Héder (1918–1978), politician from French Guiana who served in the French National Assembly and in the French Senate
Sian Heder (born 1977), American writer and filmmaker
Héder Viczay (1807–1873), Hungarian traveler, amateur archaeologist, collector, Imperial and Royal Privy Councillor